Noor-ol-Hoda Mangeneh (1902–1986) was an Iranian intellectual and one of the pioneering figures in the women's rights movement in Iran. She was born in Tehran. She was a member of Jam'iyat-e Nesvan-e Vatankhah ("Patriotic Women's League of Iran") and published Bibi magazine for women.

References 
Sanasarian, Eliz. The Women's Rights Movements in Iran, Praeger, New York: 1982, .

1902 births
People from Tehran
Iranian writers
Iranian women writers
Feminist writers
Iranian women's rights activists
Year of death missing
1970s deaths